The Under Armour High School All-America Game is a high school football all-star game typically held in early January in the U.S. state of Florida created to spotlight the nation’s top high school seniors. The game was first played on January 5, 2008, and has been played annually at Tropicana Field in St. Petersburg, Florida or at Camping World Stadium in Orlando, Florida. The game is sponsored by Under Armour and enjoys a national audience thanks to broadcast partner ESPN (the first edition was broadcast on ABC opposite the U.S. Army All-American Bowl). The game is co-owned by Chicago-based sports marketing agency Intersport and ESPN.

Player selection
National recruiting analysts and talent evaluators from ESPN Scouts, Inc., will select players for both team rosters. Eight of the top 10 ranked players in the ESPN 150 competed in the 2009 game. Because there are a number of All-America games concurrently, they are in competition for players. About 100 players are invited annually, with some having the opportunity to also participate in a televised skills competition and other ancillary events held at Disney's Wide World of Sports Complex in the days prior to the game. In addition, ESPNU televises the team practices.

As of 2019, 180 alumni of the Under Armour All-America Game had been selected in the NFL Draft, including 47 first-round draft picks and 21 NFL Pro Bowlers.

Notable alumni
 Julio Jones (2008), Atlanta Falcons All-Pro wide receiver
 A. J. Green (2008), Cincinnati Bengals All-Pro wide receiver
 Jadeveon Clowney (2011), selected No. 1 overall by Houston Texans in 2014 NFL Draft
 Jameis Winston (2012), New Orleans Saints, selected No. 1 overall by Tampa Bay Buccaneers in 2015 NFL Draft
 Landon Collins (2012), Washington Football Team, All-Pro safety with the New York Giants in 2016
 Myles Garrett (2014), selected No. 1 overall by Cleveland Browns in 2017 NFL Draft
 Leonard Fournette (2014), Tampa Bay Buccaneers running back
 Kyler Murray (2015), 2018 Heisman Trophy winner, selected No.1 overall by Arizona Cardinals in 2019 NFL Draft
 Jeff Sims (2020), Georgia Tech Yellow Jackets starting quarterback

Game results

References

External links
Official Website

All-star games
High school football games in the United States
High school sports in Florida
American football in Florida

2008 establishments in Florida